Amaliya Sharoyan (born 19 June 1988 in Yerevan) is an Armenian athlete competing in the 400 metres and 400 metres hurdles. She represented her country at three outdoor and two indoor World Championships.

Competition record

Personal bests
Outdoor
400 metres – 53.48 (Adler 2015)
400 metres hurdles – 57.97 (Moscow 2013)
Indoor
400 metres – 54.24 (Prague 2015)

References

External links

1988 births
Living people
Armenian female hurdlers
World Athletics Championships athletes for Armenia
Place of birth missing (living people)
Athletes (track and field) at the 2016 Summer Olympics
Olympic athletes of Armenia
Armenian female sprinters